C-byrån ("C bureau") was a Swedish secret intelligence agency established in 1939, sorting under the Swedish Armed Forces. It was led by Major Carl Petersén. During World War II C-byrån organized operations in the German-occupied Norway and Operation Stella Polaris in Finland.

History
When World War II broke out in 1939, Sweden lacked a modern military intelligence agency. Major Carl Petersén was assigned to establish it. C-byrån (before 1942 called G-sektionen) was established in 1939, a few months after the outbreak of the war, after a joint campaign of the then Supreme Commander Olof Thörnell and the head of the Intelligence Department of the Defence Staff, Colonel Carlos Adlercreutz. Carl Petersén and his second in command, Helmuth Ternberg, shared responsibility for the information gathering missions between them: Petersén gathered information from the Allies, while Ternberg engaged in Finland, Germany, Hungary and Switzerland. Ternberg's primary source of information, according to himself, was the head of the German Abwehr, Wilhelm Canaris. Ternberg was a German-friendly person, but for that sake not a Nazi sympathizer, however, deeply conservative and nationalist. He was like Petersén an adventurer.

One of the first people that was linked to the agency was Gunnar Jarring, who had the responsibility to attach as many academics as possible to the agency, which began in earnest in 1942. Thede Palm was one of them, PhD and friend of future prime minister Tage Erlander from their time at Lund University. Ternberg had good contacts with Wilhelm Canaris and its local organization in Stockholm, the so-called Wagner Agency. But Ternberg also recruited one of the employees, Erika Schwarze, as a secret agent, against the Germans and only for the Swedes.

Other people linked to C-byrån was art historian Stig Roth and the artist Algot Törneman. At the end of World War II, there were 149 people listed in service at C-byrån, which was housed in the so-called Centralen in an apartment at Sibyllegatan 49 in Stockholm. In 1946 C-byrån ceased to exist and Petersén and Ternberg was forced to quit. C-byrån ceased to exist after some alleged irregularities, which, however, could never be proved. The operations was investigated by the so-called C-byrån Investigation (C-byråutredningen) led by judge Erik Tammelin.

T-kontoret (T office) established in 1946 and headed by Thede Palm, continued C-byrån's operations. The archives of C-byrån was in 1967 handed over by Palm to the Military Archives. According to Palm, the archives had then been cleaned out. For example, the records of all people, Swedish and foreign who had been involved in the agency's operations or come in contact with it, had been destroyed. This has later been confirmed by other former C-byrån employees.

See also
KSI
T-kontoret
IB affair

References

Further reading

Defunct Swedish intelligence agencies
1939 establishments in Sweden
1946 disestablishments in Sweden
Intelligence services of World War II
Sweden in World War II
Norway in World War II